Clanricarde, also known as Mac William Uachtar (Upper Mac William) or the Galway Burkes, were a fully Gaelicised branch of the Hiberno-Norman House of Burgh who were important landowners in Ireland from the 13th to the 20th centuries.

Territory

The territory, in what is now County Galway, Ireland, stretched from the barony of Clare in the north-west along the borders of County Mayo, to the River Shannon in the east. Territories Clannricarde claimed dominion over included Uí Maine, Kinela, de Bermingham's Country, Síol Anmchadha and southern Sil Muirdeagh were at times at war. Those clans excepted the family’s claims on varying occasions as well, and many family members were ceremonially brought into the Irish heritage.

Title
The Clanricarde, was a Gaelic title meaning "Richard's family", or "(head of) Richard's family".  The Richard in question was Richard Mór de Burgh, 1st Lord of Connacht (died 1243), son of William de Burgh, whose great-great grandson became the first Clanricarde in the 1330s. The title was first recorded in 1335, and had probably been being used informally for a few generations. However, with the advent of the Burke Civil War (1333–1338) it came to denote the head of the Burkes of Upper or south Connacht based largely in what is now east and central County Galway. Simultaneously it was used to describe the lands held by the family.

The title Mac William Uachtar was also used as a synonym.   It was a Gaelic title meaning "son of the upper William (de Burgh)". It was used to differentiate the Burkes of upper or south Connacht from their cousins, the Burkes of lower or north Connacht, who were known was the Mac William Lower.

However it was never used as popularly as the term Clanricarde and was in any case abandoned by the end of the 16th century.

In 1543 the then Clanricarde was created Earl of Clanricarde by Henry VIII.

The Clanricardes or Mac William Uachtar 1333–1544
Ulick Burke of Annaghkeen or Sir Uilleag de Burgh, 1st Clanricarde or Mac William Uachtar (1333–1353)
Richard Óg Burke, 2nd Clanricarde or Mac William Uachtar (1353–1387)
Ulick an Fhiona Burke, 3rd Clanricarde or Mac William Uachtar (1387–1424)
William mac Ulick Burke, 4th Clanricarde or Mac William Uachtar (1424–1430)
Ulick Ruadh Burke, 5th Clanricarde or Mac William Uachtar (1430–1485)
Ulick Fionn Burke, 6th Clanricarde or Mac William Uachtar (1485–1509)
Richard Óge Burke, 7th Clanricarde or Mac William Uachtar (1509–1519)
Ulick Óge Burke, 8th Clanricarde or Mac William Uachtar (1519–1520)
Richard Mór Burke, 9th Clanricarde or Mac William Uachtar (1520–1530)
John mac Richard Mór Burke, 10th Clanricarde or Mac William Uachtar (1530–1536)
Richard Bacach Burke, 11th Clanricarde or Mac William Uachtar (1536–1538)
Ulick na gCeann Burke, 12th Clanricarde or Mac William Uachtar and 1st Earl of Clanricarde (1538–1544)
Sir Uilleag Burke, (disputed) 13th Clanricarde or Mac William Uachtar (1544–51)

Family tree

 Walter de Burgh of Burgh Castle, Norfolk m. Alice
 William de Burgh (d. 1206) m. Daughter of Domnall Mór Ó Briain, King of Thomond
 Richard Mór / Óge de Burgh, 1st Lord of Connaught m. Egidia de Lacy, Lady of Connacht
 Sir Richard de Burgh (d.1248), 2nd Lord of Connaught
 Walter de Burgh, 1st Earl of Ulster (d. 1271)
 Richard Óg de Burgh, 2nd Earl of Ulster (1259–1326)
 John de Burgh m. Elizabeth de Clare
 William Donn de Burgh, 3rd Earl of Ulster (1312–33) m. Maud of Lancaster
 Elizabeth de Burgh, 4th Countess of Ulster (1332–63) m. Lionel of Antwerp, 1st Duke of Clarence
 Philippa Plantagenet, 5th Countess of Ulster (1355–82) m. Edmund Mortimer, 3rd Earl of March
 Roger Mortimer, 4th Earl of March, 6th Earl of Ulster (1374–98)
 Edmund Mortimer, 5th Earl of March, 7th Earl of Ulster (1391–1425)
 Anne Mortimer (1388–1411) m. Richard of Conisburgh, 3rd Earl of Cambridge
 Richard of York, 3rd Duke of York, 8th Earl of Ulster (1411–60)
 Edward IV (Edward, 4th Duke of York, 9th Earl of Ulster)
 House of York (Kings and Queens of England and Ireland)
 Edmond de Burgh
 Sir Richard Burke
 Walter Burke (d. 1432)
 Burkes of Castleconnell and Brittas (Clanwilliam)
 Uileag Carragh Burke
 Burkes of Cois tSiúire (Clanwilliam)
 Sir David Burke, 
 Burkes of Muskerryquirk (Clanwilliam)
 Elizabeth, Queen of Scotland m. Robert I of Scotland
 Theobald de Burgh
 William de Burgh
 Thomas de Burgh
 Egidia de Burgh
 William Óg de Burgh (d. 1270)
 William Liath de Burgh (d. 1324)
 Sir Walter Liath de Burgh, d. 1332
 Sir Edmond Albanach de Burgh (d. 1375),  1st Mac William Íochtar (Lower Mac William), (Mayo)
 Mac William Íochtars, Viscounts Mayo and Earls of Mayo
 John de Burgh (1350–98), Chancellor of the University of Cambridge
 Richard an Fhorbhair de Burgh
 Sir Ulick de Burgh (d. 1343/53), 1st Mac William Uachtar (Upper Mac William) or Clanricarde (Galway)
 Richard Óg Burke (d. 1387)
 Ulick an Fhiona Burke
 Clanricardes, Earls of Marquesses of Clanricarde
 Raymond de Burgh
 Walter Óge de Burgh
 Raymund de Burgh
 Ulick de Burgh of Umhall
 Alice de Burgh
 Margery de Burgh
 Matilda de Burgh
 Daughter de Burgh
 Hubert de Burgh, Bishop of Limerick (d. 1250)
 William de Burgh, Sheriff of Connacht 
 Hubert de Burgh, 1st Earl of Kent (d. 1243) m.
 John de Burgh
 Hubert de Burgh
 Hubert de Burgh
 Barons Burgh
 Geoffrey de Burgh, Bishop of Ely (d. 1228)
 Thomas de Burgh

 Richard an Fhorbhair de Burgh (d.1343)
 Sir William (Ulick) de Burgh (d. 1343/53), 1st Mac William Uachtar (Upper Mac William) or Clanricarde (Galway)
 Richard Óg Burke (d. 1387), 2nd Clanricarde
 Ulick an Fhiona Burke (d. 1424), 3rd Clanricarde
 Ulick Ruadh Burke (d. 1485), 5th Clanricarde
 Edmund Burke (d. 1466)
 Ricard of Roscam (d. 1517)
 John mac Richard Mór Burke (d. 1536), 10th Clanricarde
 Ulick Fionn Burke (d.1509), 6th Clanricarde
 Ulick Óge Burke (d. 1520), 8th Clanricarde
 Richard Mór Burke (d. 1530), 9th Clanricarde
 Ulick na gCeann Burke (d. 1544), 12th Clanricarde, 1st Earl of Clanricarde (1543)
 Richard Bacach Burke (d. 1538), 11th Clanricarde
 Richard Óge Burke (d. 1519), 7th Clanricarde
 Sir Uilleag Burke (d. 1551), 13th Clanricarde
 William mac Ulick Burke (d. 1430), 4th Clanricarde
 Edmund de Burgh (d. 1410)

See also
House of Burgh
Mac William Íochtar (Lower Mac William) or Mayo (Lower Connaught) Burkes/Bourkes
Burke Civil War
Earl of Clanricarde

References

Further reading
 A New History of Ireland, volume IX, Oxford, 1984;
 Earls of Ulster and Lords of Connacht, 1205-1460 (De Burgh, De Lacy and Mortimer), p. 170;
 Mac William Burkes: Mac William Iochtar (de Burgh), Lords of Lower Connacht and Viscounts of Mayo, 1332-1649, p. 171;
 ''Burke of Clanricard: Mac William Uachtar (de Burgh), Lords of Upper Connacht and Earls of Clanricard, 1332-1722.

External links
 Burke's East Galway

Anglo-Norman Irish dynasties
House of Burgh